Melisa Zhdrella (born 10 May 2000) is a Kosovan swimmer. She competed in the women's 100 metre breaststroke event at the 2017 World Aquatics Championships.

References

2000 births
Living people
Kosovan female swimmers
Sportspeople from Pristina
Female breaststroke swimmers
Swimmers at the 2015 European Games
European Games competitors for Kosovo
Swimmers at the 2018 Summer Youth Olympics